Cedar Avenue is a roadway that runs from Minneapolis to Northfield in the U.S. state of Minnesota. The roadway is  known as Minnesota State Highway 77 in the busiest portion of the route, from Minneapolis to Apple Valley. The portions north and south of this are county roads, Hennepin County 152 and Dakota County 23, respectively. Its northern terminus in Minneapolis is at Washington Avenue in Cedar-Riverside, though its alignment is briefly interrupted by an interchange at Hiawatha Avenue to the south.

Route description 

Cedar Avenue begins as a two-lane, undivided road in the northwestern edge of Northfield at Greenvale Avenue. It goes north, following the Falk Avenue-Eveleth Avenue plane into Dakota county, jogs west to Foliage Avenue at 320th St and west again to Galaxie Avenue at 280th Street. From 280th Street northward, Cedar Avenue is relatively continuous, with official signage first showing the name near 250th Street. There is a small rural commercial district between 250th Street and Lakeville, containing multiple greenhouses and a Buddhist temple. In Lakeville just south of 215th Street, Cedar becomes a wider four-lane roadway, and gradually more urban as it enters Lakeville. In Apple Valley Cedar goes to six lanes, and becomes a main suburban thoroughfare. At the north end of Apple Valley, near 140th Street, the county road portion ends, and Cedar becomes Minnesota State Highway 77. Cedar Avenue continues north through Eagan and across the Minnesota River at the Cedar Avenue Bridge in Bloomington. North of East Old Shakopee Road, the Cedar Avenue name is not officially signed. Cedar Avenue passes the Mall of America near its junction with Minnesota State Highway 5/Interstate 494. It continues as a freeway on the east edge of Richfield before entering Minneapolis as a two-lane city street. At the southern border of Minneapolis, its designation at Highway 77 ends and it becomes Hennepin County Road 152. Cedar continues straight north, directly across a causeway over Lake Nokomis. At Lake Street, it passes the Pioneers and Soldiers Cemetery. At Hiawatha Avenue, the road jogs slightly east to facilitate an interchange. Traffic then goes west again, and north through the Cedar-Riverside neighborhood, named after the avenue. The final junction of Cedar is at Washington Avenue. This final terminus is known as Seven Corners. Hennepin County Road 152 continues into downtown Minneapolis on Washington Avenue South.

The portion south of 250th St W in Eureka Township is no longer signed as Cedar Avenue for compliance with the Dakota County grid. Nevertheless, it remains Dakota County 23 and is usually referred to as Cedar Avenue (example ).

Historical changes 
In Dakota County, Cedar Avenue was re-routed between Interstate 35E and the Minnesota River, to accommodate the freeway and new river crossing. The old Cedar Avenue is now known as Nicols Road.

In Hennepin County, Cedar Avenue was rebuilt slightly east of its old alignment. The old alignment is known as Old Cedar Avenue, and is no longer continuous; it is interrupted at Highway 5/494, 66th Street, and Minnesota State Highway 62. Old Cedar Avenue and Cedar Avenue merge at Edgewater Boulevard in Minneapolis.

At Hiawatha Avenue, Cedar Avenue was rerouted slightly east to accommodate an interchange.

Downtown, Cedar Avenue used to cross the Mississippi River at what is now the 10th Avenue Bridge; instead, it now ends at Washington Avenue.

Cultural district 
In 2020, Minneapolis officials designated a portion Cedar Avenue South as one of seven cultural districts in the city. The district's boundaries were centered around the intersection of Cedar and Riverside avenues in the Cedar-Riverside neighborhood. The purpose of the cultural district was to promote racial equity, preserve cultural identity, and promote economic growth.

Bus Rapid Transit 
Between Mall of America and 155th Street, Cedar Avenue houses the Red Line, previously known as the Cedar Avenue Bus Rapid Transitway.

Major intersections

See also 
 Cedar Avenue Bridge (Minnesota River)

References 

Transportation in Hennepin County, Minnesota
Transportation in Dakota County, Minnesota
152
023
Cultural districts in Minneapolis
Geography of Hennepin County, Minnesota
Monuments and memorials in Minnesota
Minneapolis–Saint Paul
Streets in Minneapolis